The Seversky XP-41 was a fighter aircraft built in the United States in 1939. A single prototype was modified from the last production Seversky P-35 by adding a new streamlined canopy, a Pratt & Whitney R-1830-19 engine with a two-speed supercharger, and revised landing gear. The XP-41 first flew in March 1939. The aircraft was developed in parallel with the P-43 Lancer, and work was stopped when the USAAC showed a preference for the latter.

Specifications (XP-41)

See also

References

Bibliography

 Green, William and Gordon Swanborough. "The End of the Beginning...The Seversky P-35". Air Enthusiast, No. 10, July–September 1979, pp. 8–21. 

Low-wing aircraft
P-041
Single-engined tractor aircraft
Seversky P-41
Aircraft first flown in 1939